Stegasta sattleri is a moth of the family Gelechiidae. It was described by Oleksiy V. Bidzilya and Wolfram Mey in 2011. It is found in the Democratic Republic of the Congo (Orientale), Ethiopia, Madagascar, Namibia, Tanzania and Zambia.

References

Moths described in 2011
Stegasta